The 22nd Fangoria Chainsaw Awards is an award ceremony presented for horror films that were released in 2019. The nominees were announced on January 6, 2020. The film Midsommar won four of its five nominations, including Best Wide Release, as well as the write-in poll of Best Kill. The Lighthouse took three awards, including Best Limited Release. Doctor Sleep only took one award out of its leading seven nominations.

Winners and nominees

References

Fangoria Chainsaw Awards